The 2022 Nobel Memorial Prize in Economic Sciences was divided equally between the American economists Ben S. Bernanke, Douglas W. Diamond, and Philip H. Dybvig "for research on banks and financial crises" on 10 October 2022. The award was established in 1968 by an endowment "in perpetuity" from Sweden's central bank, Sveriges Riksbank, to commemorate the bank's 300th anniversary. Laureates in the Memorial Prize in Economics are selected by the Royal Swedish Academy of Sciences. The Nobel Committee announced the reason behind their recognition, stating:

Ben Bernanke's key contributions were his research on the role of bank crises in the Great Depression of the 1930s and his response to the 2007–2008 financial crisis as head of the US Federal Reserve. Douglas Diamond and Philip Dybvig’s, on the other hand, was on the development of their Diamond–Dybvig model of bank runs.

Laureates

Ben Bernanke 

Ben Bernanke was born in Augusta, Georgia, in 1953. Bernanke earned his Bachelors and Master of Arts degree in economics in Harvard University in 1975, reciving his Ph.D. degree from the Massachusetts Institute of Technology in 1979. He became a tenured professor of economics at Princeton University from 1996 to 2002, before joining the Board of Governors of the Federal Reserve System from 2002 to 2005. He then served as chairman of the Council of Economic Advisers under President George W. Bush, later serving two terms as the Chairman of the US Federal Reserve from 2006 to 2014, directing economic policy in response to the 2007–2008 financial crisis.

Douglas Diamond 

Diamond graduated from Brown University in 1975 with a bachelor's degree in economics. The following year, and in 1977 Diamond earned Master's degrees, and ultimately a PhD in economics in 1980 from Yale University. Diamond has been a visiting professor at the Hong Kong University of Science and Technology, MIT Sloan School of Management, and the University of Bonn. In addition to these experiences, Diamond has also spent time teaching at Yale University. Currently, Diamond is the Merton H. Miller Distinguished Service Professor of Finance at the University of Chicago's Booth School of Business, he has been a member of the faculty at the University of Chicago since 1979.

Philip Dybvig 

Dybvig was formerly a professor at Yale University, and assistant professor at Princeton University. He was president of the Western Finance Association from 2002 to 2003, and has been editor or associate editor of multiple journals, including the Review of Financial Studies, Journal of Economic Theory, Finance and Stochastics, Journal of Finance, Journal of Financial Intermediation, Journal of Financial and Quantitative Analysis, and Review of Financial Studies. He is currently the Boatmen's Bancshares Professor of Banking and Finance at the Olin Business School of Washington University in St. Louis.

Nobel Committee 
The following members of Royal Swedish Academy of Sciences were in charge of the selection of the Nobel laureates for economic sciences:

Members 
 Tore Ellingsen, professor of economics; chair
 Per Krusell, professor of economics; secretary
 Peter Fredriksson, professor of economics
 John Hassler, professor of economics
 Per Strömberg, professor of finance

Co-opted Members 
 Tommy Andersson, professor of economics
 Christofer Edling, professor of sociology
 Ingrid Werner, professor of finance
 Per Johansson, professor of statistics

References

2022
Nobel Economic Sciences